Orthodoxy in Italy may refer to:

 Eastern Orthodoxy in Italy, referring to Eastern Orthodox Churches and communities in Italy
 Oriental Orthodoxy in Italy, referring to Oriental Orthodox Churches and communities in Italy
 in general, any religious, political, artistic etc. orthodoxy in Italy

See also
 Orthodoxy (disambiguation)
 Eastern Orthodoxy
 Oriental Orthodoxy